The 2018 Oklahoma gubernatorial election was held on November 6, 2018. Republican businessman Kevin Stitt was elected the governor of the state, succeeding fellow Republican Mary Fallin, who was term-limited. Primary elections occurred on June 26, 2018, with primary runoff elections having occurred on August 28, 2018.

The Democratic Party nominated former Oklahoma Attorney General Drew Edmondson. The Republican primary eliminated Lt. Gov. Todd Lamb, resulting in a runoff election between former Oklahoma City Mayor Mick Cornett and businessman Kevin Stitt. On August 28, 2018, Stitt won the Republican primary runoff and became the Republican nominee for the office. The Libertarian primary also advanced to a runoff, with Chris Powell, a former chair of the Libertarian Party of Oklahoma, winning the nomination. This was also the first election in which the Libertarian Party has been on the ballot to participate in a gubernatorial election in Oklahoma, and the first time since 1986 that a candidate from the president's party was elected Governor of Oklahoma.

A member of the Cherokee Nation, Stitt became the first tribally enrolled Native American to serve as governor of a U.S. state.

Republican primary

Candidates

Nominated
 Kevin Stitt, businessman

Eliminated in the primary runoff
Mick Cornett, former mayor of Oklahoma City

Eliminated in the initial primary
Christopher Barnett, businessman
Dan Fisher, former state representative
Eric Foutch, veteran
Barry Gowdy, nurse
Gary Jones, Oklahoma State Auditor and Inspector
Todd Lamb, Lieutenant Governor of Oklahoma
 Gary Richardson, former United States Attorney for the Eastern District of Oklahoma, nominee for OK-02 in 1978 and 1980, and independent candidate for governor in 2002
Blake "Cowboy" Stephens, rancher and educator

Endorsements

First round

Polling

Results

Runoff

Campaign finance

Polling

Results

Democratic primary

Candidates

Nominated
 Drew Edmondson, former attorney general of Oklahoma and candidate for Governor of Oklahoma in 2010

Eliminated in the primary
 Connie Johnson, former state senator and nominee for the U.S. Senate in 2014

Withdrew
 Scott Inman, state representative
 Norman Jay Brown, auto mechanic

Declined
 Dan Boren, former U.S. Representative
 Joe Dorman, former state representative and nominee for governor in 2014

Endorsements

Polling

with Norman Brown

Results

Libertarian primary

Candidates

Nominated
 Chris Powell, former chair of the Oklahoma Libertarian Party and candidate for Oklahoma County Clerk in 2016

Eliminated in the primary runoff
 Rex L. Lawhorn, former chair of the Oklahoma Americans Elect Party and Oklahoma State Director for Our America Initiative

Eliminated in the initial primary
 Joe Exotic, zoo operator

Endorsements

First round

Results

Runoff

Campaign finance

Results

General election

Oklahoma determines ballot order by a random drawing which took place for this election cycle on July 12, resulting in the Libertarian Party being listed first, Republicans second, and Democrats third.

Debates
Complete video of debate , September 24, 2018

Predictions

Polling
Graphical summary

with Mick Cornett

with Todd Lamb

Results

Statewide results

County results

Stitt won 73 counties, while Edmondson won four. Stitt won 56 counties with at least 60% of the popular vote, 14 counties with at least 70%, and three counties – Beaver, Cimarron, and Ellis – with upwards of 80%. Stitt had the largest margin of victory in Cimarron with 73.09% more votes than Edmondson's 12.27%, the latter's lowest county performance in the election. The largest county per vote count won by Stitt was Tulsa County, home of Tulsa. Oklahoma County, of which Oklahoma City is county seat, was the only county where Stitt failed to acquire three out of every seven votes.

Edmondson won Muskogee by a single vote, and had an 11.84% margin of victory – his only margin of victory above 10% – in Oklahoma County. Edmondson won his four counties with typically narrower margins than that of Stitt, having missed 50% of the popular vote in Muskogee.

Powell never came close to winning any counties, but won his highest percentage of votes in Washita County, with 4.97%

By congressional district
Stitt won 4 of 5 congressional districts.

See also
 2018 Oklahoma state elections

References

External links
Candidates at Vote Smart
Candidates at Ballotpedia

Official campaign websites
Drew Edmondson (D) for Governor
Chris Powell (L) for Governor
Kevin Stitt (R) for Governor

Gubernatorial
2018
Oklahoma